Con Lehane (7 May 1912 – 18 September 1983) was a left-wing nationalist, a 1930s member of the IRA Army Council, solicitor, actor and politician.

Background
Lehane was born in Belfast, Northern Ireland on 7 May 1912, the only surviving child of Denis Lehane, an excise officer originally from County Cork, and his wife Mary (née Connolly), a native of the Falls Road, Belfast. He grew up in an Irish-speaking household. Joseph Connolly the senator was his uncle on his mother's side, while Michael O'Lehane the trade unionist was his uncle on his father's side. His family emigrated to Hartlepool in 1912 and then to Dublin in 1920. He was educated at Synge Street CBS and University College Dublin, where he studied Law. He qualified as a solicitor. He married Marie O'Neill in 1937, and they had a son and two daughters.

As a solicitor, he took to defending members of the Irish Republican Army (IRA) in the Irish Courts. In 1927 he obtained permission for IRA prisoners to speak privately to their solicitors from the Irish High Court. He was active in other Republican and Nationalist circles: he was a member of the Moibhí Branch of Conradh na Gaeilge, and by the 1930s seems to have become active in the IRA itself. In 1931 he was involved in Saor Éire, an attempt by the Irish left-wing to create a communist political party that would have been linked to the IRA.

He was a member of the IRA's arms committee and in 1935 he was sentenced to 18 months imprisonment by the Military Tribunal for his membership of the IRA. 

He retired from the IRA in April 1938 with Seán MacBride as they were not prepared to support the planned bombing campaign in the United Kingdom during World War II. In 1940 he was a member of Córas na Poblachta, another attempt to build a Republican political party backed by the IRA.

Interned again in 1940 under the Offences against the State Acts 1939–1998 Lehane was made a commanding officer of the IRA prisoners in Arbour Hill Prison. While interned Lehane and five other Irish Republican prisoners went on a 26 day hunger strike, protesting being imprisoned without trial.

Clann na Poblachta TD
He was elected to Dáil Éireann as a Clann na Poblachta Teachta Dála (TD) for the Dublin South-Central constituency at the 1948 general election. He lost his seat at the 1951 general election.

Lehane was an actor and had a keen interest in Irish language theatre. A committed Irish speaker Lehane was at home in it, whether on radio, stage or in street conversation. He was one of the leading actors of the Irish Language Theatre Company between 1943 and 1958. He was a member of Dublin City Council and of the Citizens for Civil Liberties committee.

In 1977 the remains of Frank Ryan, one of the leading left-wing Republicans of the 1930s, were repatriated from East Germany, and Lehane delivered the eulogy.

He died on 18 September 1983 and is buried in St. Finan's cemetery.

References

1912 births
1983 deaths
Clann na Poblachta TDs
Irish Republican Army (1922–1969) members
Members of the 13th Dáil
Politicians from County Dublin
People educated at Synge Street CBS
Alumni of University College Dublin